ZPHS Dharmaram (fully Zilla Parishad High School, Dharmaram) is one of the oldest schools in Medak district.  This school is in D. Dharmaram. Recently, new buildings were constructed for the high school. The total attendance is 397 students. The school has a computer lab donated by NIIT, with 12 computers. In this laboratory, students get regular practice with computer and internet concepts.

News and events
On 31 January 2010, The 1985 - 86 SSC students gathered in the high school grounds for a reunion. For this function, the retired teachers were invited as well. All the teachers and students expressed their views, recalled their sweet memories and teachers blessed and addressed the students. It was exactly 25 years back these students studied their SSC in this school.

Scenes from the school

See also
Education in India
List of schools in India
List of institutions of higher education in Telangana

References

External links
 ZPHS Dharmaram website

High schools and secondary schools in Telangana
Medak district
Educational institutions in India with year of establishment missing